Syed Muhammad Rezaul Karim (born: 1 February 1971), also known by his title Charmonai Pir, is a Bangladeshi Deobandi Islamic scholar, politician, religious speaker and social reformer who serving as the second leader of Islami Andolan Bangladesh. He is also President of the Bangladesh Mujahid Committee  and Bangladesh Quran Education Board, and the Vice President of Befaqul Madarisil Arabia Bangladesh.

Early life and family
Syed Muhammad Rezaul Karim was born on 1 February 1971 in the village of Char Monai in Barisal, East Pakistan. He belonged to a Bengali Muslim family who were the hereditary Pirs of Charmonai, with his great-grandfather, Sayed Amjad Ali, being a descendant of Ali, the fourth Caliph of Islam. His grandfather, Syed Muhammad Ishaq, was the first Pir of Charmonai, and his father, Syed Fazlul Karim, was the second Pir of Charmonai. He has 6 brothers and 1 sister. Syed Faizul Karim is his younger brother, an influential Islamic scholar and politician in Bangladesh.

Education
He started his education from Charmonai Jamia Rashidia Islamia. He passed Kamil (post-graduate) from its Alia branch in 1991. At the same time, he used to attend classes in its Qawmi branch. Then he obtained higher degree in Fiqh and Hadith from Sagardi Islamia Kamil Madrasa, Barisal. He studied at Jamia Islamia Darul Uloom Madania for some time.

Career
After completing his education, he joined Charmonai Jamia Rashidia Islamia as a teacher of its Alia branch. Then he was assistant principals of both the branches (Alia and Qawmi) for long time. Currently, he is the main patron of both branches. He is also the President of the Bangladesh Quran Education Board and Co-President of Befaqul Madarisil Arabia Bangladesh.

He served as the chairman of Char Monai Union for two terms from 2003 to 2011.

After the death of his father on 25 November 2006, he was elected Amir of Islami Andolan Bangladesh and Bangladesh Mujahideen Committee.

Politics
From his student life, he was involved in politics of Islami Shasantantra Chhatra Andolan. Later he served as the Student Welfare Secretary of its Central Committee. He was arrested during the Four-party coalition government led by BNP for his activism in the Islamic movement.

Views

Criticism of Sheikh Hasina
At a conference in June 2019, Sheikh Hasina said about Hijab, "Hand socks, foot socks, nose and eyes covered, absolutely, what is it?  Wandering around as living tents;  It doesn't make sense."  Rezaul Karim called her statement irresponsible and called for her withdrawal.

See also
Syed Fazlul Karim
Mahmudul Hasan
Shah Ahmad Shafi
Mamunul Haque

Bibliography

References

External links

1971 births
Bangladeshi Sunni Muslims
Bangladeshi Islamic religious leaders
Bangladeshi people of Arab descent
Bangladeshi Sunni Muslim scholars of Islam
Bengali politicians
Bengali Muslim scholars of Islam
Chormonai movement
Deobandis
Deobandi Sufis
Hanafis
Living people
People from Barisal District
20th-century Bangladeshi people
21st-century Bangladeshi politicians
20th-century Bengalis
21st-century Bengalis